Babubhai Kalabhai Vaja is an Indian politician, social worker and Member of Legislative Assembly representing the Mangrol assembly constituency in the Gujarat Legislative Assembly, India. He is a member of the Indian National Congress party. He was elected to the Assembly in a by-poll in 2014 and again won 2017 Gujarat Legislative Assembly election. Vaja belong to the Koli caste of Gujarat.

References

Living people
Indian National Congress politicians
Gujarat MLAs 2012–2017
Indian National Congress politicians from Gujarat
1953 births